Hannibal High School may refer to:
Hannibal High School (Missouri), in Hannibal, Missouri
Hannibal High School (New York), part of the Hannibal Central School District, Hannibal, Oswego County, New York